In Greek mythology, Creusa (Kreousa "princess" ) was a Naiad and daughter of Gaia. She bore Hypseus, future king of the Lapiths and Stilbe to the river god Peneus. Through Hypseus she was grandmother of Cyrene, one of the best known lovers of Apollo while her daughter Stilbe gave birth to twin sons to Apollo. These sons were Lapithes and Centaurus progenitors of the Lapiths and the Centaurs.

Mythology

Pindar's Account 
...in the renowned glens of Mt. Pindus a Naiad bore him [Hypseus], Creusa the daughter of Gaia, delighting in the bed of the river-god Peneius.

Diodorus Siculus' Account 
He [Peneus] lay with the nymph named Creüsa and begat as children Hypseus and Stilbê, and with the latter Apollo lay and begat Lapithes and Centaurus.

Notes

References 

 Diodorus Siculus, The Library of History translated by Charles Henry Oldfather. Twelve volumes. Loeb Classical Library. Cambridge, Massachusetts: Harvard University Press; London: William Heinemann, Ltd. 1989. Vol. 3. Books 4.59–8. Online version at Bill Thayer's Web Site
 Diodorus Siculus, Bibliotheca Historica. Vol 1-2. Immanel Bekker. Ludwig Dindorf. Friedrich Vogel. in aedibus B. G. Teubneri. Leipzig. 1888-1890. Greek text available at the Perseus Digital Library.
 Pindar, Odes translated by Diane Arnson Svarlien. 1990. Online version at the Perseus Digital Library.
 Pindar, The Odes of Pindar including the Principal Fragments with an Introduction and an English Translation by Sir John Sandys, Litt.D., FBA. Cambridge, MA., Harvard University Press; London, William Heinemann Ltd. 1937. Greek text available at the Perseus Digital Library.

Naiads
Children of Gaia